Pope Paul VI College is a Hong Kong girls' Catholic secondary school in Shek Lei, Kwai Chung, New Territories. The English medium of instruction school was founded in 1969.

History
In 1967, Lorenzo Bianchi, then-Roman Catholic bishop of Hong Kong, invited the Missionary Sisters of the Immaculate (PIME Sisters) to establish a girls' secondary school in the Tsuen Wan area, which the Hong Kong government was developing into a new town.

Construction of the school building, beside the Shek Lei Resettlement Estate, began in July 1969. Classes began in September 1969 at the Shek Lei Catholic Primary School. The school moved to the permanent school building in August 1970, which was formally inaugurated by Director of Education John Canning on 24 May 1970.

A golden jubilee celebration was held in 2019.

Faculty
During the 2019–20 school year, the school employed 55 teachers. The current principal is Genthew Leung.

References

External links

 

1969 establishments in Hong Kong
Educational institutions established in 1969
Girls' schools in Hong Kong
Kwai Chung
Catholic secondary schools in Hong Kong